This is a list of actors born, or active in the acting field, in Bhutan.

Male actors 
 Jamyang Jamtsho Wangchuk
 Neten Chokling
 Kelly Dorji
 Sonam Kinga
 Orgyen Tobgyal

Female actors 
 Tsokye Tsomo Karchung
 Sonam Lhamo
 Dechen Pem
 Kezang Wangmo
 Tandin Bidha

See also 
 Cinema of Bhutan

References

Bhutanese
+Actresses
Actresses